Michael Wilder (born August 17, 1962) is an American chess grandmaster and a J.D graduate of the University of Michigan. FIDE awarded him the grandmaster title in 1988. He won the 1988 U.S. Chess Championship. He also tied for third in the 1987 U.S. Championship and tied for first at the 1987 London Open. Mr. Wilder retired from chess in the late 1980s and is now a practicing attorney. As of March 2007, his FIDE Elo rating was 2540. His current USCF rating, which has not changed since December 1994, is 2601.

Michael Wilder lives in the U.S. with his wife and two daughters. He is a practicing tax attorney at McDermott Will & Emery in Washington, D.C.

External links
 
 
 
 

1962 births
Living people
20th-century American Jews
American chess players
Jewish chess players
Chess grandmasters
University of Michigan Law School alumni
21st-century American Jews